Pseudocharis splendens is a moth in the subfamily Arctiinae. It was described by Herbert Druce in 1888. It is found in the Bahamas.

References

Moths described in 1888
Euchromiina